Myanmar Olympic Committee (IOC code: MYA) is the National Olympic Committee representing Myanmar (also called Burma). It was founded in 1946 by Zaw Weik.

Duty
To perform the sports affairs according to the policies of Myanmar National Sports Committee.
To inform the aims of Olympic Games.
To prepare for the national teams which will compete in the Olympic Games, Asian Games and South East Asian Games.
To interconnect between the Myanmar Sports Associations and International Olympic Committee.
To open Sports Courses and sent students to the international courses by the help of IOC.
Contact with the Olympic Games, Asian Games, Southeast Asian Games and Regional Sports Festivals Federations to host in Myanmar
To perform the duties given by the Myanmar National Sports Committee.

References

External links 
Myanmar Olympic Committee

Myanmar
Myanmar at the Olympics
Oly
1974 establishments in Burma
Sports organizations established in 1946